Katydata is a village in the Nicosia District of Cyprus, located 2 km north of Linou.

References

Communities in Nicosia District